Paul Laverty (born 1957) is a  screenwriter and lawyer best known for his screenplays for films directed by Ken Loach.

Birth and early career

Paul Laverty was born in Calcutta, West Bengal, to an Irish mother and Scottish father. He was educated at All Souls' School in Wigtown where he grew up. He obtained a philosophy degree at the Gregorian University in Rome while studying for the priesthood at the Pontifical Scots College. Thereafter he obtained a law degree at Strathclyde Law School, in Glasgow.
During the mid-1980s, he travelled to Nicaragua and lived there for almost three years. He worked for a Nicaraguan domestic human rights organisation which provided hard evidence of human rights abuses during the war between the elected Nicaraguan Government (The Sandinistas) and the United States backed "Contras" in which the subject of human rights became highly contested. Every major human rights organisation including Amnesty and Americas Watch accused the US backed contras of systematic abuse against Nicaraguan civilians. He travelled to the war-zones and obtained corroborated eyewitness accounts which were passed on to international human rights organisations. He also travelled widely in El Salvador, during its civil war, and Guatemala, too. (His interests in Latin America affairs continued much later with long research trips to Chiapas in Mexico, and along the US-Mexican border concentrating on the city of Juárez.)

Scriptwriting

After his time in Central America Laverty made contact with director Ken Loach for whom he wrote Carla's Song (1996), his first screenplay, which starred Robert Carlyle. For his acting in My Name is Joe (1998), Peter Mullan won the Best Actor award at the 2000 Cannes Film Festival. Bread and Roses (2000), detailing the experiences of migrant labour, was shot in Los Angeles, and featured Adrien Brody in a leading role. Laverty's next script, Sweet Sixteen (2002) won best screenplay award in the 2002 Cannes Film Festival.

The two men collaborated on The Wind That Shakes the Barley (2006) which concerns Irish War of Independence in early 1920s. The film won the Palme d'Or at the 2006 Cannes Film Festival. Laverty has written eight full-length feature scripts and one short directed by Ken Loach. Both work closely with producer Rebecca O'Brien. Loach's comedy featuring the French footballer Eric Cantona, Looking for Eric (2009), is a collaborative effort with Laverty, as is his film about mercenaries in Iraq, Route Irish (2010).

Personal life

Laverty has been in a relationship with Spanish filmmaker and actress  Icíar Bollaín since 1995, after meeting on the set of Ken Loach's Land and Freedom (1995). The couple live in Edinburgh with their three children.

Filmography

 Carla's Song (1996)
 My Name is Joe (1998)
 Bread and Roses (2000)
 Sweet Sixteen (2002)
 11'09"01 September 11 (2002) (UK Segment)
 Ae Fond Kiss... (2004)
 Tickets (2005)
 Cargo (2006)
 The Wind That Shakes the Barley (2006)
 It's a Free World... (2007)
 Looking for Eric (2009)
 Route Irish (2010)
 También la lluvia (2010)
 The Angels' Share (2012)
 Jimmy's Hall (2014)
 I, Daniel Blake (2016)
 The Olive Tree (2016)
 Yuli: The Carlos Acosta Story (2018)
 Sorry We Missed You (2019)

References

External links
 
 Paul Laverty Interview on The Señales de Humo

1957 births
Living people
Alumni of the University of Strathclyde
People from Kolkata
Scottish human rights activists
Scottish lawyers
Scottish people of Irish descent
Scottish screenwriters
Cannes Film Festival Award for Best Screenplay winners